Denice Klarskov (born 18 April 1986) is a Danish pornographic actress and entrepreneur.

Life and career
Klarskov started her career at 16 as a photo model, appearing in several major magazines and entering the finals of the beauty contest Miss Solskin. She starred in her first pornographic film at the age of 18 years. In 2004, she moved to Los Angeles where she worked for several years in the American adult industry.

Klarskov is the founder and the owner of "DK Production", a Danish porn production company.

She has worked one week as a guest radio hostess for the radio show Anne og de herreløse hunde - nu uden Anne on ANR (Aalborg Nærradio). In 2012, Klarskov was the subject of an episode of Emil Thorup's documentary series Emils damer, broadcast by DR HD.

She is married and lives in Lundby, Vordingborg.

Awards
 2008 XRCO Award nomination - Unsung Siren 
 2010 AVN Award nomination – Best Group Sex Scene - Ben Dover's Busty Babes

References

External links

 
 DK Production - Official site
 

1986 births
Living people
Danish film producers
Danish pornographic film actresses
Danish businesspeople